The Glenamaddy Turlough is located east of the town of Glenamaddy, County Galway in Ireland. A turlough is a seasonal lake which usually dries up in summer. Glenamaddy Turlough lies alongside the R362 regional road in the outskirts of the town, and there is a car park and viewing area on the lake-shore.

The town of Glenamaddy is reputed to get its name from the shape of the lake in winter, which is said to resemble a dog.

Wildlife
Many thousands of waterfowl come here each winter for food and shelter. Most numerous are the golden plover, which can be seen wheeling about in huge flocks. The Greenland white-fronted goose also comes but they number only 70 to 100 each winter. They breed in Greenland and over half their world population winters in Ireland. More than 200 whooper swans also spend the winter in Glenamaddy; these are unlike the common swan which resides in Ireland all year. The turlough in winter is also home to wigeon, curlew and lapwing amongst many other birds.

See also
List of loughs in Ireland

Lakes of County Galway